Kenneth George Dawes (born 17 January 1947) is a retired British wrestler. He competed at the 1972 Summer Olympics and the 1976 Summer Olympics. He also represented England in the -62 kg featherweight division, at the 1970 British Commonwealth Games in Edinburgh, Scotland.

References

External links
 

1947 births
Living people
British male sport wrestlers
Olympic wrestlers of Great Britain
Wrestlers at the 1972 Summer Olympics
Wrestlers at the 1976 Summer Olympics
Sportspeople from London
Wrestlers at the 1970 British Commonwealth Games
Commonwealth Games competitors for England